Acetylcholine receptor subunit delta is a protein that in humans is encoded by the CHRND gene.

Function 

The acetylcholine receptor of muscle has 5 subunits of 4 different types: 2 alpha and 1 each of beta, gamma and delta subunits.  After acetylcholine binding, the receptor undergoes an extensive conformation change that affects all subunits and leads to opening of an ion-conducting channel across the plasma membrane.

Interactions 

CHRND has been shown to interact with Cholinergic receptor, nicotinic, alpha 1.

See also 
 Nicotinic acetylcholine receptor

References

Further reading

External links 
 
 

Ion channels
Nicotinic acetylcholine receptors